Pholidochromis cerasina is a species of ray-finned fish from the family Pseudochromidae, the dottybacks, from the Western Pacific. This fish occasionally makes its way into the aquarium trade. It grows to a size of 7.9 cm in length.

See also 
List of marine aquarium fish species

References

Pseudochrominae
Taxa named by Anthony C. Gill
Fish described in 2004